Motl may refer to one of the following:

Surname
 Luboš Motl  (born December 5, 1973) - a Czech theoretical physicist
 Bob Motl (July 26, 1920 – June 3, 2007) - an American football end in the All-America Football Conference for the Chicago Rockets.

Given name of Jewish origin
 Motl Zelmanowicz (1914 – 16 October 2010) - a Bundist activist.
 Motl, Peysi the Cantor's Son - main character of novel by the Yiddish author Sholem Aleichem